Lyse Marie Doucet ,  (born 24 December 1958) is a Canadian journalist who is the BBC's Chief International Correspondent and senior presenter. She presents on BBC World Service radio and BBC World News television, and also reports for BBC Radio 4 and BBC News in the United Kingdom. She also makes and presents documentaries.

Early life and education
Doucet is a native of Bathurst, New Brunswick, Canada, where she grew up in an Anglophone family. Her father was Clarence "Boo" Emile Doucet and mother Norma. She is one of six children. Her sister is Andrea Doucet, a Canadian professor of sociology. She has Acadian and Irish ancestry. She graduated in 1980 with a bachelor of arts degree from Queen's University at Kingston, Ontario, where she wrote for the university newspaper.

She gained a master's degree in international relations from the University of Toronto in 1982.
The same year, she undertook a four-month volunteer assignment teaching English with Canadian Crossroads International in the Ivory Coast. She is currently one of the organisation's honorary patrons. Doucet is fluent in English and French, in addition to knowing some Dari and Arabic.

Career

From 1983 to 1988, she worked as a freelancer in West Africa for the Canadian media and for the BBC. This period proved a stepping stone to a longer-term career with the BBC. Doucet reported from Pakistan in 1988, and was based in Kabul from late 1988 to the end of 1989 to cover the Soviet troop withdrawal and its aftermath. She was the BBC correspondent in Islamabad from 1989 to 1993, also reporting from Afghanistan and Iran. In 1994 she opened the BBC office in Amman, Jordan. From 1995 to 1999, she was based in Jerusalem, travelling across the Middle East. In 1999, she joined the BBC's team of presenters but continues to report from the field.

Doucet played a leading role in the BBC's coverage of the Arab Spring, reporting from Tunisia, Egypt and Libya. She has covered all major wars in the Middle East since the mid-1990s. Doucet has been a frequent visitor to Pakistan and Afghanistan since the late 1980s. Her work includes the aftermath of major natural disasters, including the Indian Ocean tsunami in 2004, which took her to India and Indonesia. She is a contributor on rotation with other BBC journalists to Dateline London on BBC News Channel and BBC World News. 

In 2014, she made the documentary Children of Syria with film-maker Robin Barnwell, which was nominated in the Best Single Documentary category at the 2015 BAFTA Awards.

In 2015, she made the documentary Children of the Gaza War with film-maker James Jones.

In 2018, she presented two documentaries titled Syria: The World's War for BBC Two and BBC World.

Beginning on New Year's Day, 2018, Doucet presented Her Story Made History, a five-part series on BBC Radio 4 featuring in-depth interviews with five remarkable women. The theme is the relationship between women and democracy. A second series was broadcast in the summer of 2019 on BBC Radio 4 and the BBC World Service.

Doucet reported extensively from Kabul Airport during August 2021, following the coalition withdrawal from Afghanistan after the Taliban offensive in the country.

In the second half of 2021, she recorded a 10-episode podcast for BBC Sounds entitled A Wish for Afghanistan 

In February 2022, alongside Clive Myrie, she contributed to the BBC's coverage of the Russian invasion of Ukraine, from Kyiv.

Other activities
Doucet is a former Council Member of the Royal Institute of International Affairs (Chatham House). She is a founding member of the Marie Colvin Journalists' Network along with Lindsey Hilsum and Lady Jane Wellesley, a trustee of the Frontline Club for journalists, and a member of the Canadian Journalism Forum on Trauma and Violence. She is also involved with Friends of Aschiana UK, which supports working street children in Afghanistan, and is an honorary patron of Canadian Crossroads International. Doucet takes pride in her ancestry and attends the Acadian World Congress, which is held every five years. She notes: "It would be hypocritical to spend all my time learning about other tribes if I were to neglect my own."

She featured on BBC Radio 4's Desert Island Discs on 30 January 2022. Her choices included "Habibi Nour Al Ain" by Amr Diab, "Passionate Kisses" by Mary Chapin Carpenter, "Annie's Song" by John Denver and 
"L Einaudi: Elegy For The Arctic" by Ludovico Einaudi.

Awards and recognition
In 2002, she was the only journalist to accompany Afghan President Hamid Karzai to his brother's wedding, where an assassination attempt was made. She and her team were later nominated for a Royal Television Society Award for their exclusive coverage of the attempt. Doucet last interviewed Ahmed Wali Karzai in April 2011, shortly before his assassination.

In 2003, she was awarded a Silver Sony Award for News Broadcaster of the Year for her interview with Yasser Arafat in his compound in Ramallah.

In 2007, she was named International Television Personality of the Year by the Association for International Broadcasting. She also received the News and Factual award from the organisation Women in Film and Television.

Doucet won a Peabody and a David Bloom award in 2010 for her film on maternal mortality in Afghanistan, along with producer Melanie Marshall, Shoaib Sharifi and cameraman Tony Jolliffe. She won Best News Journalist at the 2010 Sony Radio Academy Awards.

In 2012, her team was awarded an Edward Murrow award for radio reports from Tunisia.

In 2014, her team was part of the BBC's Emmy award for its coverage of the Syrian conflict. Doucet was also awarded the ITV Studios Achievement of the Year Award at the annual Women in Film and Television Awards in London.

In 2015, Doucet won the Sandford St Martin trustees’ award "for her commitment to journalism and her intelligent and clear reporting of the religious elements of global events".  She also received a Bayeux-Calvados Award for war correspondents. She also won One World Media's Radio Award for a documentary on Afghan women.

In 2016, she was awarded the Columbia School of Journalism Award for exceptional journalist achievement.

At the 2017 International Media Awards, Doucet was awarded the Outstanding Contribution to Broadcasting Award. The award is given to journalists whose body of work has led to better understanding, and as a consequence increased prospects for peace. She also received the Charles Wheeler Award for Outstanding Contribution to Broadcast Journalism by the British Journalism Review.

In 2017, her team won the Luchetta Prize, awarded for work which raises the awareness of the plight of children in war,  for its story on a Syrian teenager in the Syrian city of Homs.

In 2018, she was awarded "The Trailblazer Award" from Georgetown University's Institute for Women, Peace and Security. She also received the #ChangeTheCulture award from Their World, a global children’s charity based in London UK.

Doucet has an honorary doctorate in Civil Law from the University of King's College in Halifax, Nova Scotia, an honorary Doctor of Letters degree from the University of New Brunswick (2006), an honorary Doctor of Laws degree from University College at the University of Toronto (2009), an honorary doctorate in journalism from Université de Moncton, and an honorary doctorate from Queen's University in Kingston.

In Britain, Doucet has received honorary doctorates from the University of York (2011), the University of St Andrews  (2014),  Liverpool Hope University (2015), York St John University (2015), the University of Bedfordshire (2017), the University of Sussex (2018), Queen's University Belfast (2019), Cranfield University (2019), and the University of Exeter (2022).

She was appointed an Officer of the Order of the British Empire (OBE) in the 2014 Birthday Honours for services to British broadcast journalism. She was appointed as a member of the Order of Canada in December 2018. She was nominated for another Peabody Award in 2021, for her work as a writer and reporter on Afghanistan: Documenting A Crucial Year. 

In March 2023, Doucet was awarded the Mungo Park Medal by the Royal Scottish Geographical Society at a ceremony in Perth, Scotland.

References

External links

Lyse Doucet profile at BBC NewsWatch
 Lyse Doucet on Twitter
 Lyse Doucet BBC Blog

1958 births
Living people
BBC newsreaders and journalists
BBC World News
BBC World Service presenters
Canadian television news anchors
Canadian television reporters and correspondents
People from Bathurst, New Brunswick
Journalists from New Brunswick
Queen's University at Kingston alumni
University of Toronto alumni
Canadian women television journalists
Canadian people of Acadian descent
Canadian people of Irish descent
Mi'kmaq people
Canadian Officers of the Order of the British Empire
Canadian expatriates in England
WFTV Award winners
Members of the Order of Canada
Canadian women radio hosts